Louis C. Kramer (July 25, 1848 - August 18, 1922) was a professional baseball executive who served as the president of the American Association in 1891.

Career
Kramer, a lawyer, was one of the initial financial backers of the Cincinnati Red Stockings American Association club in 1881. He and club president Aaron S. Stern sold their shares to partner George Herancourt after the 1884 season. Kramer would remain a member of the clubs' board of directors.

He replaced Allen W. Thurman as president of the Association on February 18, 1891. Problems with finding suitable umpires, and the disbanding of the Cincinnati Kelly's Killers in August 1891, led to his resignation as president on August 18, effective September 1.

Personal life
Kramer was married to Emilie Stern and had two daughters.

Death
Kramer died on August 18, 1922 while he and his wife were vacationing at Charlevoix, Michigan.

References

Baseball executives
1848 births
1922 deaths
Sportspeople from Cincinnati